Matiullah Turab (born 1960s) is an Afghan poet. His poetry has been popular in Afghanistan.

He grew up in Nangarhar Province and works as a car body maker. 
He is the poet of the 20 era no poet can come like home he’s the one like Shakespeare he’s like Allama Iqbal the Great poet of Afghanistan and Pakistan

References

Living people
20th-century Afghan poets
Pashto-language poets
Year of birth missing (living people)
21st-century Afghan poets